The voiceless bilabial plosive or stop is a type of consonantal sound used in most spoken languages.

Features

Features of the voiceless bilabial plosive:

Varieties

Occurrence

(See voiced velar stop for another such gap.) This is an areal feature of the circum-Saharan zone (Africa north of the equator plus the Arabian peninsula). It is not known how old this areal feature is, and whether it might be a recent phenomenon due to Arabic as a prestige language (Arabic  shifted  to  but the timing of this change is not known), or whether Arabic was itself affected by a more ancient areal pattern. It is found in other areas as well; for example, in Europe, Proto-Celtic and Old Basque are both reconstructed as having  but no .

Nonetheless, the  sound is very common cross-linguistically. Most languages have at least a plain , and some distinguish more than one variety.

Examples

See also 
 List of phonetics topics

Notes

References

External links
 

Bilabial stops
Voiceless stops
Pulmonic consonants
Labial–coronal consonants